Sándor Dóra (24 February 1905 - 8 June 1986) was a Hungarian sport shooter who won 14 medals at individual senior level at the World Championships and European Championships.

He was the brother of Pál Dóra, sport shooter champion too.

Biography
With three victories in the trap at the European Championships, as the Italian Giovanni Pellielo, he is the most titled athlete in history in this discipline at the championships.

See also
 Trap European Champions

References

External links
 

1905 births
1986 deaths
Place of birth missing
Trap and double trap shooters
Hungarian male sport shooters
20th-century Hungarian people